Citizen Way, formerly known as The Least of These, is a contemporary Christian music and Christian rock band from Elgin, Illinois. Ben Blascoe retired from the band in 2015. The band relocated to Nashville, Tennessee in 2016 and Josh Calhoun left after that time. In December 2019, Daniel Olsson and David Blascoe posted on social media that they were departing the group as well.

Background

Citizen Way is from Elgin, Illinois, founded by two sets of brothers Ben Blascoe on bass guitar, David Blascoe on drums, Ben Calhoun on vocals and guitar and Josh Calhoun on guitars, keys and vocals. Their original band name was The Least of These, when they were at Judson University together. This band has been together since 2004. They relocated to Nashville, Tennessee in 2016. 

The band released their debut single, "Should've Been Me", on the Fair Trade Services label on June 26, 2012. Their second single, "Nothing Ever (Could Separate Us)", was released in June 2013. Their third single, "How Sweet the Sound", was released on September 27, 2013, and has gone on to become their first No. 1 single. It has charted on Christian AC Indicator and Soft AC/Inspirational, reaching No. 1 on the Christian Soft AC/Inspirational chart on April 3, 2014. The single spent four weeks atop the Christian Soft AC/Inspirational chart.

Discography

Albums

Singles

Promotional singles

Notes

References

External links
 
 All Access Interview

Christian rock groups from Illinois
Fair Trade Services artists
Musical groups established in 2004